Alessandro Sandreani (born 20 October 1979) is an Italian professional football manager and a former player who played as a midfielder.

He is the son of former player and coach Mauro Sandreani.

Playing career
Sandreani began his career with amateur side Cantianese in 1997. After playing well for Cagliese, in 2002 he marked his arrival in professional football by wearing the shirt of Gubbio in Serie C2. On 30 August 2011, he made his debut in Serie B, in a 3–2 loss against Ascoli.

Coaching career
On 22 March 2018, he was hired as manager of the Serie C club Gubbio, the same club he spent most of his playing career.
On 1 June 2018, Sandreani signed a one-year extension to his current contract keeping him at the club until the end of the 2018–19 season. On 26 November 2018, he was fired by Gubbio, with the team in 15th place in the table.

References

External links
 Profile at Legaseriea.it 
 Profile at Football.it 

1979 births
Living people
Italian footballers
A.S. Gubbio 1910 players
Serie B players
Association football midfielders
Italian football managers
A.S. Gubbio 1910 managers